There are numerous dams and reservoirs in the Dominican Republic, which is composed of rivers, lakes, streams, and numerous waterfalls.

The main rivers in the Dominican Republic are the Yaque del Norte, which is the longest in the country at 201 km in length. The second largest and the strongest river is the Yuna River which is 138 km in length and the third largest is the Yaque del Sur which is 136 km in length.

 

Note:

 *Actual capacity might vary
 **Some rivers have the same name as dams or hydro-electric plants.

See also

Electricity sector in the Dominican Republic
Geography of the Dominican Republic
List of dams and reservoirs

Economy of the Dominican Republic
Hydroelectric power stations in the Dominican Republic
Dams in the Dominican Republic
Dominican Republic
Dams and reservoirs